Tuomas Markkula (born 28 June 1990) is a Finnish footballer, who currently plays for Finnish Ykkönen (second level) side RoPS Rovaniemi.

Previously Markkula has played in TPS Turku and in Finnish third level Kakkonen with Åbo IFK. TPS is ÅIFK's parent club.

He has represented nationally Finland in youth level.

References
Guardian Football

1990 births
Living people
Finnish footballers
Association football forwards
Turun Palloseura footballers
Rovaniemen Palloseura players
Åbo IFK players